Reference Re Residential Tenancies Act (Ontario), [1981] 1 S.C.R. 714 is a leading Supreme Court of Canada decision on the jurisdiction of superior courts provided by section 96 of the Constitution Act, 1867. The Court formulated a three-step test for determining whether an administrative body was encroaching upon the jurisdiction of the superior courts.

Test formulated by Court

Justice Dickson, writing for the majority, suggested the test. 
 Firstly, it must be determined "whether the power or jurisdiction conforms to the power or jurisdiction exercised by superior, district or county courts at the time of Confederation." 
 Secondly, the test asks "whether the function itself is different when viewed in that setting. In particular, can the function still be considered to be a 'judicial' function." 
 Thirdly, the test asks the court to "review the tribunal's function as a whole in order to appraise the impugned function in its entire institutional context."

In this case, it was determined that Ontario's Residential Tenancies Act was not valid provincial legislation.

Subsequent case law
The test was later applied in Massey Ferguson Industries v. Govt. of Sask., [1981] 2 S.C.R. 413, and eventually modified in Sobeys Stores v. Yeomans, [1989] 1 S.C.R. 238.

See also
 List of Supreme Court of Canada cases (Laskin Court)

Notes

External links
 

Canadian constitutional case law
Supreme Court of Canada cases
1981 in Canadian case law
Landlord–tenant law
Supreme Court of Canada reference question cases
Real property law of Canada